Carol Ann Burns (29 October 1947 – 22 December 2015) was an Australian actress, theatre director and patron of the arts, with a career spanning 50 years. She worked extensively in theatre and television serials, as well as telemovies and mini-series in Australia and the United Kingdom. In Australia she was a founding member of the Queensland Theatre Company.

Burns was an original cast member, as Franky Doyle, in the serial Prisoner  during the first season in 1979 and although she only appeared in the first 20 episodes, she became a major breakout and much loved character, and gained cult status as a fan favourite.

Early life
 
Burns was born and raised in Brisbane, Queensland. Her mother Mary (née Langford) was a receptionist and her father William was a motor spare parts manager. She attended Milton State Primary School where her initiation into the world of theatre began with speech and drama classes in 1958. Burns acted with Brisbane Arts Theatre and also Twelfth Night Theatre, where she was a student of theatre director, Joan Whalley, and also tutored within the junior drama workshops, in Brisbane.

Career

Television and film
 
Burns' major television role was her performance in the cult television program Prisoner, in which she played the tough but affable lesbian bikie character, Frieda "Franky" Doyle. Although only appearing in the first 20 episodes, her character attained cult status, resulting in her winning a Logie Award for Best Lead Actress in a Series. Burns stated in a 2011 interview that she left the show due to very low pay and an increased workload as a result of the more rapid production of episodes. She also stated that it was her decision to be killed off as she did not want to be lured back. After Burns's departure from the series the producers released a telemovie titled The Franky Doyle Story which they compiled using footage from the episodes in which Burns had participated.

Burns, an experienced and versatile theatre actress, went to the UK and appeared in numerous West End theatre productions and had roles in TV series such as The Bill, Taggart and Heartbeat. Burns also appeared in films, particularly during the late 1970s and 1980s, including The Mango Tree (1977), Bad Blood (1981), Starstruck (1982) and Strikebound (1984)

Theatre 
 
Burns had acted exclusively in the theatre for ten years before film or television, based in Brisbane. In 2005, Burns performed in the Queensland Theatre Company's sell-out season of Edward Albee's production of The Goat, or Who is Sylvia?. As part of the 2007 season, she appeared in The Glass Menagerie by Tennessee Williams. She performed for La Boite Theatre. She was in a stage production of Elizabeth: Almost by Chance a Woman by Italian playwright Dario Fo. In 2015, Burns played, in what turned out to be her final performance, the lead role of Winnie in Samuel Beckett's Happy Days for Queensland Theatre Company.

Burns directed the Queensland Theatre Company productions of The Road to Mecca (2002) and A Day in the Death of Joe Egg (2003), as well as her own adaptation of Picnic at Hanging Rock (2013) at Brisbane Arts Theatre.

Personal life and death
Burns was married to Alan Lawrence, a British-born musician and composer, for 36 years. She died on 22 December 2015, after a brief cancer illness at the Princess Alexandra Hospital in Brisbane at the age of 68.

Filmography

Awards, honours and nominations

References

External links
 Theatre Credits 
 
 Queensland Theatre Company – The Glass Menagerie
 View diary of Maria Steley  written in 1863–1864 and narrated by Carol Burns. This virtual book is held at the State Library of Queensland, reference code OM71-14.

1947 births
2015 deaths
Actresses from Brisbane
Australian film actresses
Australian soap opera actresses
Australian stage actresses
Deaths from cancer in Queensland
Drama teachers
Logie Award winners
People educated at Brisbane State High School
20th-century Australian actresses
21st-century Australian actresses